Jalan Permatang Pauh, Federal Route 3111 (formerly Penang state route P7), is an industrial federal road in Penang, Malaysia. It is also a main route to North–South Expressway Northern Route via Permatang Pauh Interchange.

At most sections, the Federal Route 3111 was built under the JKR R5 road standard, allowing maximum speed limit of up to 90 km/h.

List of junctions

References

Malaysian Federal Roads